Haplogroup D may refer to:

 Haplogroup D (mtDNA), a human mitochondrial DNA (mtDNA) haplogroup
 Haplogroup D (Y-DNA), a human Y-chromosome (Y-DNA) haplogroup